Xenosoma flavisedes is a moth in the subfamily Arctiinae first described by Paul Dognin in 1891. It is found in Venezuela.

References

Arctiinae